Baharab (also Romanized as Bahārāb; also known as Qal‘eh Amīr Khān and Qal‘eh-ye Amīr Khān) is a village in Khorram Rud Rural District, in the Central District of Tuyserkan County, Hamadan Province, Iran. At the 2006 census, its population was 239, in 72 families.

References 

Populated places in Tuyserkan County